Uppermill Railway Station served the village of Uppermill in Oldham. It was built by the London and North Western Railway on their Micklehurst Line from Stalybridge to Diggle and Huddersfield. It opened in 1886 and closed to passengers in 1917. Regular passenger trains continued to pass through the station until 1964 and the line was closed completely in 1966.

References

An Illustrated History of Oldham's Railways by John Hooper

Disused railway stations in the Metropolitan Borough of Oldham
Former London and North Western Railway stations
Railway stations in Great Britain opened in 1886
Railway stations in Great Britain closed in 1917